Leptospermum macrocarpum is a species of shrub that is endemic to the Blue Mountains in New South Wales. It has thin, hard, sometimes gnarled bark on the older stems, broadly elliptical leaves, relatively large white, pink or dark red flowers and large fruit.

Description
There are large, broad, reddish brown bracts at the base of the flower buds but these are shed before the flower opens.

Taxonomy and naming
This tea-tree was first formally described in 1898 by Joseph Maiden and Betche who gave it the name Leptospermum lanigerum var. macrocarpum and published the description in the Linnean Society of New South Wales from specimens collected by Jesse Gregson on Mt Tomah in 1897. In 1989, Joy Thompson raised the variety to species status as Leptospermum macrocarpum.

Distribution and habitat
Leptospermum macrocarpum grows in heath or forest on exposed sandstone in the Blue Mountains.

References

macrocarpum
Myrtales of Australia
Flora of New South Wales
Plants described in 1898
Taxa named by Joseph Maiden
Taxa named by Ernst Betche